Ali Fayad may refer to:
 Ali Fayad (footballer) (born 1991), player of association football
 Ali Fayad (American football) (born 1999), player of American football
 Ali Fayad (arms dealer), Lebanese arms dealer